Streženice is a village and municipality in Púchov District in the Trenčín Region of north-western Slovakia.

History
In historical records the village was first mentioned in 1408.

Geography
The municipality lies at an altitude of 260 metres and covers an area of 7.984 km2. It has a population of about 855 people.

References

External links
 
 
http://www.statistics.sk/mosmis/eng/run.html

Villages and municipalities in Púchov District